The Résidence de la Cambre is the first high-rise building constructed in Brussels, Belgium. It was built in 1938–39, according to the plans of the architect Marcel Peeters, in a style inspired by New York Art Deco architecture. The 17-story residential tower, which stands at 20, /, near the / in Ixelles, was listed as a protected monument on 14 July 2005. In April 2007, €740,000 were granted by the Government of the Brussels-Capital Region to renovate the facade and roof.

The Résidence de la Cambre is a short walk from La Cambre Abbey and the eastern shores of the Ixelles Ponds, a part of Brussels particularly rich in Art Deco architecture.

See also

 Art Deco in Brussels
 History of Brussels

References

Notes

Buildings and structures in Brussels
Ixelles
Protected heritage sites in Brussels
Art Deco skyscrapers
Skyscrapers in Belgium
Art Deco architecture in Belgium
Residential skyscrapers
Residential buildings completed in 1939